Cene may refer to:

People
 Cene Marković, Serbian commander
 Cene Prevc (born 1996), Slovenian ski jumper
 Charles Le Cène (1647?–1703), French controversialist
 Ilhami Çene (born 1909), Turkish fencer
 Michel-Charles Le Cène (1684–1743), French printer

Places
 Cene, Lombardy, town in the province of Bergamo, Italy

Other
 Clube Esportivo Nova Esperança, Brazilian football team

See also
 Cena (disambiguation)